The 2016–2017 Zimbabwe floods began in December 2016, following a severe drought. The flooding killed at least 250 people and injured another 128 over three months and left around 2,000 people homeless, according to Zimbabwean officials. At least seventy bridges on major highways were swept away, according to Transport Minister Joram Gumbo.

The President of Zimbabwe Robert Mugabe declared the floods a national disaster.

See also
2010–2011 Southern Africa floods
2015 Southeast Africa floods

References 	

Zimbabwe floods
Zimbabwe floods
2016 in Zimbabwe
2017 in Zimbabwe
Floods in Zimbabwe 
2016 disasters in Zimbabwe 
2017 disasters in Zimbabwe